Barbosella gardneri is a species of orchid endemic to Brazil. It is the type species of its genus.

References

External links

gardneri
Orchids of Brazil
Plants described in 1842